Estate Hafensight, also known as Havensight, located south of Charlotte Amalie on Saint Thomas, U.S. Virgin Islands, was listed on the National Register of Historic Places in 1978.

Background
The listing includes Havensight Great House, which is a  one story site on a high basement, with a terrace.  It includes a large cistern, a tenant house built on foundations of former slave quarters, a cookhouse, ruins of a bake oven, and more.

References

National Register of Historic Places in the United States Virgin Islands
Buildings and structures completed in 1812
Southside, Saint Thomas, U.S. Virgin Islands